Andrew Michael Nenninger (born November 13, 1981), known professionally as Kentucker Audley, is an American filmmaker and actor. He appeared on the 2007 Filmmaker Magazine list of 25 New Faces of Independent Film. He founded the independent film platform NoBudge, first as a Tumblr blog in 2011 and then a full website in 2015.

Early life
Audley was born in St. Louis, Missouri to parents Jane and Michael and grew up in Lexington, Kentucky. He attended Mary Queen of the Holy Rosary School and then Lexington Catholic High School. He began his studies in film and video production at Savannah College of Art & Design and gained experience at the Memphis Digital Media Co-Op before going on to graduate from the University of Memphis in 2005. His pseudonym is an homage to his home state of Kentucky.

Artistry
Early in his career, Audley was commonly associated with the Southern mumblecore movement, his first feature film Team Picture (2007) being principal among it. He first became interested in film when he watched Wes Anderson's Bottle Rocket (1996) in the eighth grade. He has cited the likes of Jim Jarmusch, John Cassavetes, and Jean-Luc Godard as his inspirations.

Personal life
Audley lives in Brooklyn with his wife and collaborator Caroline White. The couple met in 2005 while visiting Graceland in Memphis and married in July 2016 at Box Hill Estate in Long Island, New York.

Filmography

Filmmaking

Acting

References

External links

NoBudge

Living people
1981 births
Actors from Lexington, Kentucky
American film editors
American mass media company founders
Filmmakers from Kentucky
University of Memphis alumni